Clandon railway station is located in the village of West Clandon in Surrey, England.

The station is managed by South Western Railway, who provide the majority of train services; Southern also provide some peak period services.

It is situated on the New Guildford Line between Waterloo and Guildford via Cobham or Epsom.

Services
All services at Clandon are operated by South Western Railway using  EMUs.

The typical off-peak service in trains per hour is:
 3 tph to 

Additional services run via Epsom during the peak hours, increasing the service to 4 tph in each direction.

Accidents and incidents 

 On 4 January 2019, a 51-year-old male passenger was fatally stabbed on board a South Western Railway service from Guildford to London Waterloo, as it was travelling between London Road and Clandon stations. The train was stopped at the next station along the line, Horsley, to allow emergency services to deal with the incident. The suspect in the stabbing exited the train at Clandon and was arrested the following day. The suspect, Darren Pencille, was subsequently found guilty of murder and sentenced to life imprisonment.

References

External links

Railway stations in Surrey
Former London and South Western Railway stations
Railway stations in Great Britain opened in 1885
Railway stations served by South Western Railway